The 2015 CollegeInsider.com Postseason Tournament (CIT) was a postseason single-elimination tournament of 32 NCAA Division I basketball teams. The first round started on March 16, 2015. The semifinals were played on March 31, and the championship game was on April 2, 2015. The Evansville Purple Aces beat the Northern Arizona Lumberjacks for their first CIT championship.

Thirty-two participants who belonged to "mid-major" conferences, or were independent, and were not invited to the 2015 NCAA Tournament, National Invitation Tournament (NIT), or College Basketball Invitational (CBI) made up the field.

At the request of the NCAA Men's Basketball Rules Committee, the CIT experimented with a 30-second shot clock during the 2015 tournament.

Participating teams
The following teams received an invitation to the 2015 CIT:

Format
As in the previous year, the CIT used the former model which was traditionally used by the NIT in which teams are re-seeded and match-ups are determined based on the results of the previous round. All games were played on campus sites.

Schedule

Bracket
Bracket is for visual purposes only. The CIT does not have a set bracket.

Home teams listed second.
* Denotes overtime period.

References

CollegeInsider.com
CollegeInsider.com Postseason Tournament